KSLI (1280 AM, "92.5 The Ranch" is an AM radio station that serves the Abilene, Texas, area. The station is owned by Townsquare Media and airs a Red Dirt/Texas Country music format, simulcasting KMWX 92.5 FM Abilene.

On Monday, March 1, 2010, the news/talk format on KSLI moved to sister station KYYW. KSLI then began broadcasting the classic country format that had been on KYYW.

On Monday, February 10, 2020 KSLI transitioned from a classic country music format to a red dirt/Texas country music format. 1280 KSLI still airs Abilene Wylie High School basketball, baseball and softball games, and is affiliated with Texas Farm Bureau.

The station was owned by Gap Central Broadcasting, which bought the station from Clear Channel Communications in 2007. Gap Central Broadcasting was folded into Townsquare Media on August 13, 2010.

On January 9, 2023 KSLI began simulcasting KMWX 92.5 FM Abilene and rebranded as "92.5 The Ranch".

References

External links
KSLI official website

SLI
Country radio stations in the United States
Radio stations established in 1957
Townsquare Media radio stations